The river Créquoise is one of the small streams that flow from the plateau of the southern Boulonnais and Picardy, into the Canche.

The river rises at Créquy and passes by Torcy, Royon, Lebiez, Hesmond, Offin, Loison-sur-Créquoise and joins the Canche at Beaurainville.
Three small tributaries join the Créquoise, the Fosse du Corval, L'Embrienne and le Surgeon

See also
 Schéma directeur d'aménagement et de gestion des eaux

References

External links
Carte Géologique de la France à l'échelle du millionième 6th edn. BRGM (2003) 
 Carte des bassins versants de la Canche et de la Ternoise
 Informations sur les atlas des zones inondables

Rivers of France
Rivers of the Pas-de-Calais
Rivers of Hauts-de-France